Brembilla was a comune in the province of Bergamo, in Lombardy, Italy. It was situated 15 km northwest of Bergamo. In 2014, the municipality of Gerosa was merged with Brembilla to create a new municipality, named Val Brembilla.

Bounding communes
Blello
Gerosa
San Pellegrino Terme
Zogno
Ubiale Clanezzo
Capizzone
Berbenno
Sant'Omobono Imagna
Corna Imagna

Twin towns — sister cities
Brembilla was twinned with:

  Nantua, France (2011)

References

External links
 Brembilla  
 Valle Brembilla